The Zaghawa people, also called Beri or Zakhawa, are a Sahelian Muslim ethnic group primarily residing in Libya Fezzan North-eastern Chad, and western Sudan, including Darfur.

Zaghawas speak the Zaghawa language, which is an eastern Saharan language. They are pastoralists, and a breed of sheep that they herd is called Zaghawa by the Arabs. They are nomadic and obtain much of their livelihood through herding cattle, camels and sheep and harvesting wild grains. It has been estimated that there are 307,000 Zaghawas.

Names 
The Kanemite royal history, the Girgam, refers to the Zaghawa people as the Duguwa. Today, Zaghawa refer to themselves as the Beri, while the Arab people and literature refers to them as "Zaghawa". In literature related to African ethnic groups, the term Beri (sometimes Kegi) includes Zaghawas, Bideyat and Bertis peoples, each clustered in different parts of Chad, Sudan and Libya.

History 
The Zaghawa are mentioned in classical Arabic language texts. The 9th century Arab geographer al-Ya'qubi wrote of them as the “Zaghawa who live in a place called Kanem,” and proceeded to list a string of other kingdoms under Zaghawa rule. Historically, the Zaghawa people held a sort of hegemony over most of the smaller societies that stretched along the Sahel between Lake Chad to the Nile valley kingdoms of Nubia, Makuria and Alwa.

The Zaghawa people were trading with the Nile region and the Maghreb regions by the 1st millennium CE. The earliest references to them in 8th century texts are made jointly with the Toubou people of northern Chad and southern Libya, and scholars believe the two are related ethnic groups. The 11th century texts mention that the kings of the Zaghawa kingdom had accepted Islam, and were at least nominally Muslims. 

The early Arabic accounts describe the Zaghawa to be "black nomads". The 12th century geographer Al-Idrisi and the 13th century Yaqut describe the Zaghawa influence around an oasis centered system, and they mention the towns of Kanem, Manan and Anjimi. 

Ibn Sa'id, however, writing in 1270 states that Manan was the capital of Kanem kingdom until the Sayfawa dynasty rulers converted to Islam, conquered the region, thereafter the capital shifted to Njimi. The Zaghawa continued to live in Manan, wrote Ibn Said. However, the records of Kanem do not mention Zaghawa, and it is likely that they were displaced and they then moved into the region they are currently found. This region is called Dar Zaghawa, or the "land of the Zaghawa".

Although Zaghawa power was broken by the rise of Kanem in the Lake Chad region, Zaghawa retained control over a considerable portion of the lands lying east of Kanem, and it is only in the late 14th century that Darfur is mentioned as an independent state by the Egyptian historian and geographer Maqrizi. Following the rise of Darfur and Kanem, the Zaghawa appear to have controlled only desert areas and ceased to be a major regional power.

Society and culture
The traditional Zaghawa society has led a predominantly pastoral life, made up of nomadic clans with horse, donkeys, goat and sheep herd keeping focus. At their peak strength before the Sayfawa dynasty rulers displaced and disbanded them, they were noted merchants and traders with camels and horses, controlling some of the sub-Saharan caravan trade routes.

They accepted the Maliki school of Sunni Islam, but retained some of their pre-Islamic rites such as karama – a ritual sacrifice of animals to ward off evil spirits. The century in which they converted has been a subject of debate and little consensus, with estimates ranging from the 13th to the early 17th century. In contemporary times, they lead a sedentary lifestyle, growing staples such as millet and sorghum, and other foods such as sesame, melons, pumpkins, peanuts and okra.

The Zaghawa people are believed to be part of the larger Berber ethnic group that is found in North Africa. The Berbers have a long and rich history in the region and are considered to be one of the earliest indigenous peoples of North Africa.
The Zaghawa are thought to have descended from Berber-speaking communities and share many cultural and linguistic similarities with other
Berber groups. However, the Zaghawa have developed their own unique identity and traditions over time, and are considered to be a separatecentral Saharan region to their current territories in Libya,Chad and Sudan.The earliest recorded history of the Zaghawa dates back several centuries and they have played an important role in the political and economic history of Chad and Sudan. The Zaghawa have a rich cultural heritage and have maintained their own unique language, traditions, and customs, despite the challenges they have faced over time, including armed conflicts and political instability.

Social stratification
The Zaghawa society has been socially stratified and has included castes. The upper strata has been of nobles and warriors, below them have been the traders and merchants, below whom have been the artisan castes called the Hadaheed (or Hadahid). These castes have been endogamous, and their inherited occupations have included iron work, hunters, pottery, leatherwork and musicians such as drummers. The artisan work has traditionally been viewed within the Zaghawa society as dirty and of inferior status, being people from different pagan and Jewish roots who slowly assimilated into the Islamic society. Some of the early Arab texts refer to the Zaghawa royalty as "blacksmith kings with inconceivable arrogance".

The term "blacksmith" has been a derogatory term in Zaghawa culture, states Anne Haour – a professor of African Studies and Medieval Archaeology, and "if born a blacksmith one will always be a blacksmith". Non-blacksmith castes of Zaghawa neither eat nor associate with the blacksmith castes. The lowest strata has been the slaves. The social stratification and castes such as for the leatherworker strata within the Zaghawa people is similar to those found in nearby Fur people.

Contemporary influence
While they are not very powerful in Sudan, they politically dominate Chad. The former president, Idriss Déby and several former prime ministers of Chad are Zaghawa, as well as many other members of the government. Thus the Chadian Zaghawa have been influential people in the regional politics. In contemporary wars in Chad, Libya and Sudan, the Zaghawa ethnic group has been deeply involved, particularly through strategic alliances with other ethnic groups such as the Fur people.

However, in Sudan, the Zaghawa are caught up in the Darfur crisis, and have suffered much loss from the troubles there. The Zaghawa of Sudan are among the peoples living in the refugee camps in Darfur and eastern Chad where the recruitment of child soldiers into rebel movements is an ongoing problem.

The Zaghawa have been among the tribes in Darfur who have been referred to as "African" even as other tribes that have fought with them have been called "Arab".

As a result of Tijani Muslim missionaries from West Africa who were traveling through their area to make the pilgrimage to Mecca, the leadership converted to Islam. In the 1940s, the Zaghawa began to turn to Islam from Animism en masse. In Darfur, the Zaghawa are well-known for their piety. Due to the fighting in Darfur, where they are targeted by local Arab militia due to their ethnic heritage, 100,000 have become refugees across the border in Chad. A Zaghawa tribesman named Daoud Hari wrote a memoir about Darfur called The Translator and a Zaghawa woman named Dr. Halima Bashir co-authored a memoir with Damien Lewis called Tears of the Desert, which both spread knowledge about the atrocities in Darfur.

See also
Kabka Sultanate

Notes

External links
 African people
 Aljazeera English video on the Zaghawa people of Chad
 Ethnogenesis from with the Chadic State, Dierk Lange (1993)
Music video "Zaghawa Girl" ("بري تلي") by Majid Kurbiya, with English Translation and notes
Music video "Let's Go, Youth" ("شبابي قوبي كيدي") by Haydar wad Fa, with English Translation and notes

 
Ethnic groups in Chad
Ethnic groups in Sudan
African nomads
Muslim communities in Africa
Darfur
Kanem Empire